The Bluff River is a river of New Zealand. It is in the Canterbury Region and is a tributary of the Waiau Toa / Clarence River. Confusingly, the Bluff Stream, another tributary of the Waiau Toa / Clarence, follows a largely parallel course  to the east.

See also
List of rivers of New Zealand

References
Land Information New Zealand - Search for Place Names

Rivers of Canterbury, New Zealand
Rivers of New Zealand